Nothing but the Blues is a 1995 documentary film about Eric Clapton's musical journey and his love for Blues music. Martin Scorsese was one of the executive producers. It is not to be confused with the 2003 album release Martin Scorsese Presents the Blues: Eric Clapton.

Content
The film features live performances of blues standards covered by Eric Clapton as well as historical video footage of blues musicians of various generations including Howlin' Wolf, B.B. King, Muddy Waters, Buddy Guy, T-Bone Walker, Little Walter, Freddie King and Jimmy Rogers. Eric Clapton also talks with Martin Scorsese about his personal musical journey and how the past blues legends have influenced his style and approach to music. The recording sessions took place on November 8, and November 9, 1994 at the Fillmore in San Francisco, California.

Release
The film was released on June 19, 1995 in the United States via the PBS broadcasting companies around the country. The film was released in colour and has no content advisory for parents on it.

The film was not released on home video until 2022, for unclear reasons. Originally, the plan was set by Martin Scorsese to release the movie in summer of 1995. However, later Warner Reprise Video produced some promotional tapes on VHS and DVD for limited release. Since then, the film has been uploaded to various internet platforms, making it widely accessible. In 2022, Reprise Records announced that the film has been remastered in 4K and will be released for the first time on Blu-ray and DVD.  The soundtrack was also released in June 2022.

Reception
Martin Scorsese, David Horn, John Beug, Stephen 'Scooter' Weintraub and Ken Ehrlich were nominated for the Outstanding Cultural Program Primetime Emmy Award at the 1995 Emmy Awards.

Personnel
Musicians

Eric Clapton – guitar · vocals
Andy Fairweather Low – guitar
Jerry Portnoy – harmonica

Chris Stainton – piano
Dave Bronze – bass
Andy Newmark – drums · percussion

The Kick Horns – horn section

Production

Martin Scorsese – executive producer
John Beug – executive producer
David Horn – executive producer
Ken Ehrlich – producer

Stephen 'Scooter' Weintraub – producer
Jon Vesey – editor
Lisa Day – editor
Kenneth C. Barrows – camera operator

Anthony Hardwick – assistant camera
Tom Kenny – lighting director
John C. Morgan – lighting director

References

External links
 

Blues video albums
Eric Clapton video albums
Reprise Records video albums
Warner Bros. films
1990s English-language films